The Ace of Spades (also known as the Spadille and Death Card) is traditionally the highest and most valued card in the deck of playing cards in English-speaking countries. The actual value of the card varies from game to game.

Design
The ornate design of the ace of spades, common in packs today, stems from the 17th century, when James I and later Queen Anne imposed laws requiring the ace of spades to bear an insignia of the printing house. Stamp duty, an idea imported to England by Charles I, was extended to playing cards in 1711 by Queen Anne and lasted until 1960.

Over the years, a number of methods were used to show that duty had been paid. From 1712 onwards, one of the cards in the pack, usually the ace of spades, was marked with a hand stamp. In 1765 hand stamping was replaced by the printing of the official ace of spades by the Stamp Office, incorporating the royal coat of arms. In 1828 the Duty Ace of Spades (known as "Old Frizzle") was printed to indicate a reduced duty of a shilling had been paid.

One maker of cards was caught in possession of forged aces and the equipment to produce them. This was a capital offence, the prosecutor the Attorney General Spencer Perceval (later to become the prime minister assassinated in 1812) obtained the conviction of Richard Harding and he was hanged in 1805. The association of the ace of spades with death may spring from such events.

The system was changed again in 1862 when official threepenny duty wrappers were introduced and although the makers were free to use whatever design they wanted, most chose to keep the ornate ace of spades that is popular today. The ace of spades is thus used to show the card manufacturer's information.

Since 1882, an annual pack of cards has been produced by the Worshipful Company of Makers of Playing Cards at the installation of each master and since 1888, a portrait of the Master has appeared at the centre of the ace of spades.

The exact design of the ace card was so important, it eventually became the subject of design patents and trademarking. For example, on 5 December 1882, George G. White was granted U.S. design patent US0D0013473 for his design. His ace design was adorned with male and female figures leaning onto the spade from either side.

Symbolism

War 

The ace of spades has been employed, on numerous occasions, in the theatre of war. In the First World War, the 12th (Eastern) Division of the British Army used the Ace of spades symbol as their insignia. In the Second World War, the 25th Infantry Division of the Indian Army used an Ace of Spades on a green background as their insignia.

In World War II, the soldiers of the 506th Parachute Infantry Regiment of the American 101st Airborne Division were marked with the spades symbol painted on the sides of their helmets. In this capacity, it was used to represent good luck, due to its fortunate connotations in card playing. Following the confusion of a large-scale combat airborne operation, all four card-suits were used for ease of identification of regiments within the airborne division. Battalions within the regiments were denoted with tic marks or dots, struck from top clockwise: headquarters at the twelve o'clock position, 1st Battalion at the three o'clock, etc.

During the Vietnam War, some U.S. troops falsely believed that Vietnamese traditions held the symbolism of the spade to mean death and ill-fortune and in a bid to frighten and demoralise Viet Cong soldiers, it was common practice to leave an ace of spades on the bodies of killed Vietnamese. This custom was said to be so effective that the United States Playing Card Company was asked by Charlie Company, 2nd Battalion, 35th Infantry Regiment to supply crates of that single card in bulk. The plain white tuck cases were marked "Bicycle Secret Weapon", and the cards were deliberately scattered in villages and in the jungle during raids. The ace of spades, while not a symbol of superstitious fear to the Viet Cong forces, did help the morale of American soldiers. Some U.S. soldiers and Marines were reportedly sticking this card in their helmet band as a sort of anti-peace sign.

In 2003, a deck of most-wanted Iraqi playing cards was issued to U.S. soldiers during Operation Iraqi Freedom, with each card displaying the picture of a wanted Iraqi official on it. Saddam Hussein got the "Ace of Spades" card.

Idioms
Various idioms involving the ace of spades include "black as the ace of spades," which may refer either to completely black; totally without light or colour, colour, race, (lack of) morality, or (lack of) cleanliness in a person. 

The French expression fagoté comme l'as de pique translates to "(badly) dressed like the ace of spades."

In Unicode
  is part of the playing cards in Unicode

See also 
 Black Spot (Treasure Island)
 List of playing-card nicknames
French-suited playing cards
Trump cards
Tax stamp
Black Spades

Notes

References

External links

 The Death Card

Playing cards
Articles containing video clips
Cultural aspects of death

de:Ass (Spielkarte)#Das Pik-Ass im Vereinigten Königreich